Nam Hee-suk (born July 6, 1971), is a South Korean comedian. He also hosted Global Talk Show from 2006 to 2010.

Filmography

Variety shows
 2014: Running Man (guest, ep. 207)
 2021: I'm Going to Meet You (Channel A , Host)

Awards and nominations
Won SBS 20th Anniversary Entertainment Top 10 Star Award in 2010 SBS Entertainment Awards

References

External links
 

1971 births
Living people
South Korean male comedians
South Korean television presenters
Dankook University alumni
Uiryeong Nam clan
Best Variety Performer Male Paeksang Arts Award (television) winners